Carmel Christian School (CCS) was an independent Early Year's provider in Brislington, Bristol, England. Founded in 1997, the school originally provided all-through education, then in late 2020 became a facility solely for nursery and reception children.

The setting openly promoted a Christian ethos and worldview while delivering the Early Years Foundation Stage (EYFS) curriculum. Staff regularly evaluated their practice through The Bristol Standard.

In July 2022, the proprietor and charity trustees closed the setting.

References

External links
Carmel Christian School, Bristol

Private schools in Bristol
Christian schools in England